La Grande Station was the Atchison, Topeka and Santa Fe Railway's (Santa Fe) main passenger terminal in Los Angeles, California from 1893 until the opening of Union Station in 1939. The station was located at 2nd Street and Santa Fe Avenue on the west bank of the Los Angeles River, just south of the First Street viaduct built in 1929.

History 

Santa Fe opened La Grande Station on July 29, 1893. The station was unique for Southern California with its Moorish-inspired architecture. Los Angeles Railway Yellow Cars called at the street adjacent to the station by 1920, and was at different times served by the N, 7, and 9 lines.

Heavy damage from the 1933 Long Beach earthquake meant the last operating years of the station were spent in a state of disrepair as portions of the building, including the dome, had to be removed for the safety of passengers.  When Union Station opened in 1939, Santa Fe moved all of its passenger services there. 

Despite the closure, it was used as a staging ground for the Internment of Japanese Americans in Los Angeles. La Grande Station was demolished in 1946.

In popular culture 
Many Hollywood movies were filmed at the stylish station.  Laurel and Hardy's film Berth Marks (1929) was one of the first sound movies shot on location. Other movies that used Santa Fe's La Grande Station included Choo-Choo! (1932) (Our Gang — Little Rascals), Lady Killer (1933) with James Cagney, Swing Time (1936) with Fred Astaire, and Something to Sing About (1937).

References

External links 

 Atsfrr.net—Santa Fe Historical & Modeling Society: La Grande Station, 1914 remodeling plans 
 Ulwaf.com: Los Angeles in the 1900s: La Grande Station
 Los Angeles Times feature with photographs

Railway stations in Los Angeles
Buildings and structures in Downtown Los Angeles
Former Atchison, Topeka and Santa Fe Railway stations in California
Demolished buildings and structures in Los Angeles
Demolished railway stations in the United States
History of Los Angeles
Landmarks in Los Angeles
Transit centers in the United States
Railway stations in the United States opened in 1893
1893 establishments in California
Railway stations closed in 1939
1939 disestablishments in California
19th century in Los Angeles
1890s architecture in the United States
Moorish Revival architecture in California
Victorian architecture in California
Buildings and structures demolished in 1946